The Flatow district was a district that existed in Prussia from 1818 to 1945. It belonged to the province of West Prussia until 1920. After World War I, the eastern portion of the district was ceded to Poland. The western portion of the district remained in Germany and became part of the Frontier March of Posen-West Prussia until 1938. The district then became part of the Province of Pomerania from 1938 to 1945. Today the territory of the Flatow district lies in the Kuyavian-Pomeranian Voivodeship and the Greater Poland Voivodeship in Poland.

History 
The area of the Flatow district originally belonged to the Netze District, which was annexed by Prussia in the First Partition of Poland in 1772.  In 1815, the area around Flatow became part of Regierungsbezirk Marienwerder in the province of West Prussia. The Flatow district was founded on April 1, 1818. It consisted of the five towns Flatow, Kamin, Krojanke, Vandsburg and Zempelburg. The capital of the district was the town of Flatow. From 1829 to 1878, West Prussia and East Prussia were united to form the Province of Prussia, which belonged to the German Empire from 1871.

After World War I, when the Treaty of Versailles came into force on January 10, 1920, the eastern part of the Flatow district with the towns of Vandsburg, Zempelburg and Kamin was ceded to Poland without a referendum for the purpose of establishing the Polish Corridor. 30,516 people lived there, of whom 8,600 were Poles.

On July 1, 1922, the new Prussian province of Grenzmark Posen-West Prussia was formed, which included the Flatow district. In the same year, the Flatow district was enlarged with the inclusion of the rural community of Schönfeld, which was earlier part of the Kolmar district. On October 1, 1938, the Flatow district was incorporated into the Province of Pomerania after the Posen-West Prussia province was dissolved.

In the spring of 1945, the Flatow district was occupied by the Red Army. After the end of World War II, the district became part of Poland under the terms of the Potsdam Agreement.

Demographics 
The district had a German majority population, with a significant Polish minority. After 1920, with the loss of the eastern part of the district, the remainder of the district in Germany had a Polish minority of 16.8% (including bilinguals) according to the census of 1925.

Elections 
In the German Empire, the Flatow district together with the Schlochau district formed the Marienwerder 7 Reichstag constituency. This constituency was usually won by conservative candidates:

 1871: Botho Heinrich zu Eulenburg, German Conservative Party
 1874: Botho Heinrich zu Eulenburg, German Conservative Party
 1877: Botho Heinrich zu Eulenburg, German Conservative Party
 1878: Adalbert von Flottwell, German Conservative Party
 1881: Viktor von Tepper-Laski, Free Conservative Party
 1884: Wilhelm Scheffer, German Conservative Party
 1887: Wilhelm Scheffer, German Conservative Party
 1890: Wilhelm Scheffer, German Conservative Party
 1893: Georg von Kanitz, German Conservative Party
 1898: Robert Hilgendorff, German Conservative Party
 1903: Otto Böckler, German Reform Party
 1907: Fritz Wilckens, German Conservative Party
 1912: Wilhelm von Knigge, German Conservative Party

Municipalities

Municipalities ceded to Poland in 1920 
The eastern part of the district, which was ceded to Poland in 1920 included the following towns and communities:

Municipalities in 1945 
At the end of its existence in 1945, the district comprised two towns and 66 other municipalities

Place names 
In the course of the 20th century, many place names in the district which were considered "not German" enough were given a phonetic alignment or translation:

 Augustowo → Augustendorf, 1914
 Cziskowo → Ziskau, 1912
 Dollnik → Wittenburg, 1926
 Glubschin → Steinau, 1926
 Hüttenbusch → Wilhelmsbruch, 1928
 Klukowo → Blankenfelde, 1928
 Leßnick → Lessendorf, 1926
 Obodowo → Obendorf, 1908
 Ossowke → Espenhagen, 1926
 Ossowo → Aspenau, 1926
 Paruschke → Treuenheide, 1926
 Petzewo → Deutsch Fier, 1926
 Podrusen → Preußenfeld, 1927
 Polnisch Wisniewke → Lugetal, 1913
 Skietz → Kietz, 1926
 Slawianowo → Steinmark, 1939
 Smirdowo bei Flatow → Schmirdau, 1909
 Smirdowo bei Krojanke → Schmirtenau, 1909
 Wersk → Seedorf, 1926
 Zakrzewke → Seemark, 1907
 Zakrzewo → Buschdorf, 1935

References 

Populated places disestablished in 1945
1818 establishments in Prussia
Złotów County
Sępólno County
Districts of West Prussia
Posen-West Prussia
Province of Pomerania (1815–1945)